József Simó (1925 – September 1950) was a Hungarian rower. He competed in the men's double sculls event at the 1948 Summer Olympics.

References

1925 births
1950 deaths
Hungarian male rowers
Olympic rowers of Hungary
Rowers at the 1948 Summer Olympics
Rowers from Budapest